Kylie Morris is an Australian journalist who was the Washington, D.C. correspondent for the UK's Channel 4 News until August 2019. She moved to the United Kingdom in 1998 after working with the Australian Broadcasting Corporation. She began working for the BBC in 2000 as a foreign correspondent. During her time there she covered the second intifada in Gaza, and post-war Afghanistan. She was based in Thailand at the time of the Indian Ocean tsunami and has reported from wartime Iraq. Morris interviewed disgraced British glam rock singer Gary Glitter inside his Vietnamese prison in 2006, Morris joined Channel 4 News as its Asia correspondent.

Morris quit Channel 4 News in August 2019 and returned to Newcastle, New South Wales with her family. She was replaced in her position by Siobhan Kennedy.

Morris is married to British film director Bharat Nalluri.

References

External links
MORE4 News Announces new presenter (8 May 2007)
BBC profile

Living people
Alumni of the London School of Economics
Australian emigrants to England
Australian expatriates in England
Australian reporters and correspondents
BBC newsreaders and journalists
ITN newsreaders and journalists
Year of birth missing (living people)